The European Tour 2014/2015 – Event 2 (also known as the 2014 Arcaden Paul Hunter Classic) was a professional minor-ranking snooker tournament that took place between 20 and 24 August 2014 in Fürth, Germany.

Aditya Mehta made the 106th official maximum break during his last 32 match against Stephen Maguire. Mehta became the first Indian player to compile an official 147.

Ronnie O'Sullivan was the defending champion, but he lost 2–4 against Tian Pengfei in the last 16.

Mark Allen won his seventh professional title by defeating Judd Trump 4–2 in the final.

Prize fund 
The breakdown of prize money of the event is shown below:

Main draw

Preliminary rounds

Round 1 
Best of 7 frames

Round 2 
Best of 7 frames

Round 3 
Best of 7 frames

Main rounds

Top half

Section 1

Section 2

Section 3

Section 4

Bottom half

Section 5

Section 6

Section 7

Section 8

Finals

Century breaks 

 147  Aditya Mehta
 143, 111, 108, 106, 104  Judd Trump
 141, 132, 107  Stephen Maguire
 139, 102  Mark Allen
 132  Paul Davison
 131, 113  Ricky Walden
 130  Mark Joyce
 129, 101  Li Hang
 124, 106, 102  Anthony McGill
 123  Xiao Guodong
 122  Neil Robertson
 121, 107  Mark Selby
 121  Andrew Higginson

 120, 112  Tian Pengfei
 118  David Gilbert
 116  Jimmy White
 114, 105, 101  Ronnie O'Sullivan
 114  Marco Fu
 109  Robert Milkins
 108  Martin O'Donnell
 105  Reanne Evans
 104  Martin Gould
 103  Daniel Wells
 102  Jamie Cope
 101  Graeme Dott
 100  Mike Dunn

References 

2014
ET2
2014 in German sport